José Lázaro Fuerte Advíncula Jr. (born March 30, 1952) is a Filipino prelate of the Catholic Church and a professed member of the Dominican Order who became 33rd Archbishop of Manila on June 24, 2021. He became a cardinal in November 2020. He previously served as bishop of San Carlos from 2001 to 2011 and Archbishop of Cápiz from 2011 to 2021. On December 16, 2020, Pope Francis appointed Cardinal Advincula as a member of the Dicastery for Clergy.

Early life and studies
Advíncula was born on March 30, 1952, in Dumalag, Capiz to José Firmalino Advíncula and Carmen Falsis Fuerte. He studied at Saint Pius X Seminary High School in Roxas City, and stayed on after graduating to study philosophy. He then attended theology courses at the University of Santo Tomas in Manila.

He later studied Master of Arts in Education major in Guidance and Counseling at De La Salle University and then canon law at the University of Santo Tomás and at the Angelicum in Rome, where he earned a licentiate in canon law. During these studies he joined the Priestly Fraternity of St. Dominic.

Priesthood
He was ordained a priest of the archdiocese of Cápiz on April 4, 1976. He worked as spiritual director of St. Pius X Seminary while also Professor and Dean of Studies.

After finishing his studies abroad, he returned to the Philippines and worked at the seminary of Nueva Segovia in Vigan City, Ilocos Sur, and in the regional seminary of Jaro. In 1995, he became rector of St. Pius X Seminary of Cápiz; he also held positions in the administration of the archdiocese as defender of the bond, promoter of justice, and judicial vicar. In 1999, he became parish priest of Santo Tomás de Villanueva Parish in Dao, Capiz.

Bishop of San Carlos
Pope John Paul II appointed him bishop of San Carlos on July 25, 2001, and he received his episcopal consecration on September 8, 2001.

Archbishop of Capiz
On November 9, 2011, Pope Benedict XVI named him archbishop of Cápiz. Within the Catholic Bishops' Conference of the Philippines, he has been a member of the Commission for the Doctrine of the Faith and Commission for Indigenous Peoples.

Elevation to the cardinalate
Pope Francis created him as a cardinal in a consistory on November 28, 2020, assigning him as a cardinal priest to San Vigilio in Via Paolo Di Dono. He was not able to attend the consistory because of COVID-19 pandemic risks and restrictions. On December 16, he was named a member of the Congregation for the Clergy.

In lieu of the November 2020 consistory, Advincula received his 'red hat' (biretta) and ring from Charles John Brown, the Apostolic Nuncio to the Philippines, on June 18, 2021, at the Immaculate Conception Cathedral in Roxas City.

Tumandok killings
On January 15, 2021, all eight bishops in the ecclesiastical provinces of Capiz and Jaro (Cardinal Advincula of Capiz, Archbishop Jose Romeo Lazo of Jaro, Bishops Jose Corazon Tala-oc of Kalibo, Narciso Abellana of Romblon, Marvyn Maceda of San Jose de Antique, Patricio Buzon of Bacolod, Gerardo Alminaza  of San Carlos, and Louie Galbines of Kabankalan) issued a joint pastoral letter calling for an investigation to the December 30, 2021 joint military and police operation in the towns of Tapaz in Capiz and Calinog in Iloilo that killed nine leaders of the Tumandok indigenous people's group that opposes the Jalaur mega dam project. The families of the victims claimed that they are victims of red-tagging and that firearms and explosives were planted. The pastoral letter was read on January 24.

However, the task force to end local communist armed conflict in Western Visayas region believe that the bishops have been misinformed and were prone to commit errors. The bishops were cautioned by the task force from making 'hasty, false and presumptuous conclusions' and criticized them for not issuing statements when government forces and civilians are killed in rebel attacks. The military and the police maintained that those who were killed and arrested were leaders of the Communist Party of the Philippines and New People's Army.

Archbishop of Manila
On March 25, 2021, Pope Francis appointed him Archbishop of Manila, to succeed Luis Antonio Tagle, who vacated the post on February 9, 2020 after being appointed as prefect of the Congregation for the Evangelization of Peoples. He is the first archbishop of Manila to be already a cardinal when appointed to the see. Past archbishops (Rufino Santos, Jaime Sin, Gaudencio Rosales, and Luis Antonio Tagle) were made cardinals after their installation.

He was installed on June 24, 2021, by Archbishop Charles John Brown, Apostolic Nuncio to the Philippines together with Cardinal Gaudencio Rosales and Cardinal Orlando Quevedo. He is the 33rd Archbishop of Manila, and the sixth native Filipino to hold the post, following centuries of Spanish, American, and Irish prelates.

The event coincided with the death of former President Benigno Aquino III which led him to offer prayers towards the end of the mass. On the next day, he went to Aquino's wake and blessed his remains.

He received the pallium as metropolitan archbishop of the ecclesiastical province of Manila from Pope Francis, through Archbishop Charles John Brown, the Apostolic Nuncio to the Philippines, on December 8, 2021.

Advincula made his solemn profession as a professed member of the Order of Preachers on December 11, 2021. Making his solemn profession to the prior provincial of the order in the Philippines, Filemon dela Cruz, Advincula received the white religious habit of the order.

On April 30, 2022, Advincula was named Cardinal-Priest of Parrocchia San Vigilio in Rome, Italy.

On 13 July 2022, Pope Francis named him a member of the Dicastery for Bishops.

Coat of Arms
On May 23, 2021, the Archdiocese of Manila - Office of Communications and the Manila Cathedral Facebook pages showed Advíncula's coat of arms as archbishop of Manila for the first time. It has the coat of arms of the Archdiocese of Manila combined with Advíncula's personal coat of arms, under an ecclesiastical hat with tassels knotted in a different way than his coat of arms as archbishop of Capiz.

The coat of arms was released by the Chancery of the Archdiocese of Manila on June 6, 2021.

See also
Cardinals created by Pope Francis

References

External links
 
  

1952 births
Living people
People from Capiz
21st-century Roman Catholic archbishops in the Philippines
Roman Catholic archbishops of Manila
Dominican cardinals
Dominican bishops
Filipino cardinals
Cardinals created by Pope Francis
De La Salle University alumni
University of Santo Tomas alumni
Visayan people
Roman Catholic archbishops of Capiz
Filipino Dominicans